Chan Yung-jan and Chuang Chia-jung emerged the victors of the 2007 Ordina Open Women's Doubles Competition.

Seeds

  Chan Yung-Jan Chuang Chia-Jung (champions)
  Meghann Shaughnessy Janette Husárová (quarterfinals)
  Anabel Medina Garrigues Virginia Ruano Pascual (final)
  Gisela Dulko Meilen Tu (quarterfinals)

Draw

External links
Draw

Women's Doubles
Ordina Open